Jan de Graaff (21 April 1943 – 30 March 2014) was a Dutch television journalist. He started his job in 1962 for the news agency UPI, from 1966 he worked for VARA on radio and television, including as editor of Behind the News. He was born in The Hague, South Holland.

Jan de Graaff died on 30 March 2014 in Tilburg, North Brabant. He was 70 years old.

References

External links
 Jan de Graaff at ANP 

1943 births
2014 deaths
Dutch male writers
Dutch journalists
Mass media people from The Hague
Dutch television presenters